The oyster crab (Zaops ostreus)  is a small, whitish or translucent crab in the family Pinnotheridae.

Ecology
It is less than half an inch across, and lives inside the gills of an oyster or a clam. It uses the oyster for protection and lives on the food that the oyster gets for itself. It is found in oysters in the North Atlantic Ocean.

Distribution
Zaops ostreus is found along the eastern seaboards of North America and South America, from Massachusetts to Brazil, including the Gulf of Mexico and the Caribbean Sea.

References

Further reading

Pinnotheroidea
Crabs of the Atlantic Ocean
Crustaceans described in 1817
Taxa named by Thomas Say